The Last Fleksnes is a 1974 Norwegian comedy film directed by Bo Hermansson, starring Rolv Wesenlund and Aud Schønemann. The film is based on the television sitcom Fleksnes Fataliteter. It was entered into the 9th Moscow International Film Festival.

Marve Fleksnes (Wesenlund) lives a comfortable life with his mother (Schønemann), but misses a woman in his life. He is afraid he might become the last Fleksnes. His mother enrols him in a charm school, where he excels. At the same time, a young lady moves into the apartment across the hall.

Cast
 Rolv Wesenlund as Marve Fleksnes
 Aud Schønemann as Modern
 Finn Mehlum as Faderen
 Per Christensen as Per
 Britt Langlie as Britt Andersen
 Kjersti Døvigen as Unni
 Marit Kolbræk as Karin
 Ella Hval as Frk. Gustavsen
 Knut M. Hansson as Ekteskapsformidler
 Julie Ege as Herself

References

External links
 
 

1974 films
1974 comedy films
1970s Norwegian-language films
Norwegian comedy films